The men's shot put at the 1974 European Athletics Championships was held in Rome, Italy, at Stadio Olimpico on 4 and 6 September 1974.

Medalists

Results

Final
6 September

Qualification
4 September

Participation
According to an unofficial count, 20 athletes from 12 countries participated in the event.

 (2)
 (3)
 (1)
 (2)
 (1)
 (1)
 (1)
 (2)
 (2)
 (1)
 (2)
 (2)

References

Shot put
Shot put at the European Athletics Championships